The Sabrang Film Awards are an awards ceremony recognizing the best of Bhojpuri cinema. The awards have been presented annually since 2014.
The awards are given for the following categories: Best Film, Best Director, Best Actor, Best Actress, Best Supporting Actress, Best Actor in a Negative Role, Best Actor in A comic role, and Best Debut and many more.

Sabrang Film Awards 2019 
Sabrang 2019 was held on 4 September 2019 at Atharva College, Malad (Mumbai) and the show was hosted by Awadhesh Mishra, Smrity Sinha, Ritu Singh and Sonalika Prasad.  The show was presented by "Godrej Expert Rich Cream"; and the associate sponsors were "Popular Group of Hospitals" and "Krishna Sudama Education Group".

Popular awards

Musical awards

Technical awards

Special awards

Sabrang Film Awards 2018 
Sabrang 2018 was held on 22 October 2018 at Atharva College, Malad (Mumbai) and the show was hosted by Awadhesh Mishra and Smiriti Sinha.  Many Bollywood and Bhojpuri personalities attended as guests, such as Bappi Lahiri, Brijesh Sandilya, Ravi Kishan, Khesari Lal Yadav, Kajal Raghwani, Sambhavna Seth, and others.

Popular awards

Musical awards

Technical awards

Special awards

Sabrang Film Awards 2017
Sabrang 2017 was held on 1 November 2017 at Dinanath Mangeshkar Natyagriha Vile Parle, Mumbai. The show was presented by Bhojpuri Panchayat Patrika, sponsored by Good Night Fast Card, and the telecast partners were Bhojpuri Cinema TV and Dangal. The show hosted by Sunil Sawra and Yash Kumar Mishra. Many Bollywood and Bhojpuri personalities come as guests, including Prem Chopra, Brijesh Sandilya, Sunil Paul, Poonam Jhawer, Udit Narayan, Deepa Narayan, Ravi Kishan, Khesari Lal Yadav, Dinesh Lal Yadav, Amrapali Dubey, and Anjana Singh.

Sabrang Film Awards 2016
Sabrang 2016 was held on 3 September 2016 at Naveen Bhai Thakkar Auditorium Vile Parle, Mumbai.  The show was presented by Bhojpuri Panchayat Patrika, sponsored by Frontline, Abhiyan, Jivika Film Production, Bihari Connet, Wave Music and Worldwide Records Bhojpuri.  Telecast partners were Bhojpuri Cinema TV and Dangal.  Sabrang 2016 was hosted by Priyesh Sinha, Ritu Singh and Ajeet Anand.

References

2014 establishments in Bihar
Bhojpuri cinema
Cinema of Bihar
Indian film awards